The Prairie Trail is a  shared use path for walking and cycling, located adjacent in McHenry County, Illinois. The path is part of the Grand Illinois Trail and connects McHenry County to other trails in the Chicago metropolitan area. It is considered to be a good example of convert old methods of transportation to a new one.

The connecting trails are:
 Hebron Trail
 Moraine Hills State Park Trails
 Glacial Park Trails
 Fox River Trail

The trail follows the old Chicago and Northwestern rail line that ran from Kane County into Wisconsin.

References

External links 
 McHenry County Conservation District's Prairie Trail Map

McHenry County, Illinois
McHenry, Illinois
Crystal Lake, Illinois